Mongolostegus (meaning "Mongolian roof") is a genus of stegosaur from the Early Cretaceous (Aptian-Albian) Dzunbain Formation of Mongolia. The type and only species is M. exspectabilis, known from a single specimen previously under the nomen nudum Wuerhosaurus mongoliensis.

Discovery and description
Mongolostegus was first reported by Alifanov et al. (2005) and Alifanov (2012) as an indeterminate stegosaur based on posterior dorsal and anterior caudal vertebrae as well as pelvic material. Ulansky (2014) informally dubbed the material Wuerhosaurus mongoliensis, but Galton and Carpenter (2016) found W. mongoliensis to be invalid. It was formally named as Mongolostegus by Tumanova and Alifanov in 2018.

See also 
 Timeline of stegosaur research

References 

Stegosaurs
Early Cretaceous dinosaurs of Asia
Cretaceous Mongolia
Aptian life
Fossils of Mongolia
Fossil taxa described in 2018
Ornithischian genera